State Route 111 (SR 111) is a primary state highway in the U.S. state of Virginia.  The state highway runs  from U.S. Route 460 Business (US 460 Business) east to US 11 and US 460 Business within Christiansburg.

Route description

SR 111 begins at an intersection with US 460 Business (Franklin Street) on the north side of the town of Christiansburg.  The intersection is immediately south of the business route's interchange with mainline US 460.  SR 111 heads east as two-lane undivided Cambria Street, which parallels the US 460 freeway to just west of Yellow Sulphur Road, where the street curves south.  The state highway has a grade crossing of Norfolk Southern Railway's Christiansburg District immediately before curving to the east.  Within the curve, SR 111 intersects Depot Street, which heads south to downtown Christiansburg.  SR 111 continues east along Depot Street parallel to the rail line, then veers southeast to the highway's eastern terminus at US 11 and US 460 Business (Roanoke Street) on the east side of Christiansburg.

Major intersections

References

External links

Virginia Highways Project: VA 111

111
State Route 111